This is a list of movies that used the music of songwriter Irving Berlin (1888–1989). This list includes only feature films from Berlin's lifetime.

1920s

Filmography